The 2015 San Jose Earthquakes season is the club's 33rd year of existence, their 17th season in Major League Soccer and their 8th consecutive season in the top-flight of American soccer. It the club's first season playing in Avaya Stadium, their new soccer-specific stadium.

Background

Club

Current roster 

As of July 6, 2015.

Non-competitive

Arizona friendlies

Las Vegas Pro Soccer Challenge Cup

California friendlies

International Champions Cup

Competitive

Major League Soccer

Standings 

Western Conference Table

Overall Table

Results

U.S. Open Cup 

San Jose will enter the 2015 U.S. Open Cup with the rest of Major League Soccer in the fourth round.

transfers in  
F Kris Tyrpak (11/19/14 - Dispersal Draft)
M Leandro Barrera (12/10/14 - Waiver Draft)
F Mark Sherrod (12/11/14 - trade from Orlando City)
GK Andy Gruenebaum (12/12/14 - Re-Entry Stage 1 Draft)
D Marvell Wynne (12/18/14 - Re-Entry Stage 2 Draft)
M Sanna Nyassi (12/18/14 - Re-Entry Stage 2 Draft)
M Fatai Alashe (1/15/15 - SuperDraft)
F Innocent Emeghara (1/31/15 - free)
D Paulo Renato (2/26/15 - free)
GK Tomas Gomez (3/26/15 - free)
F Quincy Amarikwa (6/26/15 - trade from Chicago)
M Matheus Silva (7/15/15 - waivers)
M Marc Pelosi (7/17/15 - Allocation)
M Anibal Godoy (8/6/15 - signed from Budapest Honved)
M Khari Stephenson (9/11/15 - returned from loan

transfers out 
D Jason Hernandez (12/10/14 - Expansion Draft: to NYCFC)
GK Jon Busch (12/11/14 - out of contract)
D Andreas Gorlitz (12/11/14 - option declined)
GK Billy Knutsen (12/11/14 - option declined)
D Tommy Muller (12/11/14 - option declined)
F Billy Schuler (12/11/14 - option declined: to Whitecaps FC 2)
M Atiba Harris (12/18/14 - Re-Entry Stage 2 Draft: to FC Dallas)
M Yannick Djalo (12/31/14 - loan expired: to Benfica)
M Sam Cronin (1/19/15 - traded: to Colorado)
GK Andy Gruenebaum (retired)
F Kris Tyrpak (2/26/15 - waived: to Austin Aztex)
D Brandon Barklage (3/18/15 - mutual contract termination:to Saint Louis FC )
D Ty Harden (6/26/15 - traded: to Chicago)
M Khari Stephenson (8/5/15 - loaned: to San Antonio)

References 

San Jose Earthquakes
San Jose Earthquakes seasons
San Jose Earthquakes
San Jose Earthquakes